Basie Jam 2 is a 1976 studio album by Count Basie, the follow-up to 1973's Basie Jam.

Track listing 
 "Mama Don't Wear No Drawers" (Count Basie, Benny Carter, Clark Terry) – 12:33
 "Doggin' Around" (Edgar Battle, Herschel Evans) – 10:59
 "Kansas City Line" (Count Basie, Louie Bellson, Benny Carter, Eddie "Lockjaw" Davis, Al Grey, John Heard, Joe Pass, Clark Terry) – 14:57
 "Jump" (Basie, Carter, J.J. Johnson, Terry) – 9:59

Personnel 
 Count Basie - piano
 Benny Carter - alto saxophone
 Eddie "Lockjaw" Davis - tenor saxophone
 Al Grey - trombone
 Clark Terry - trumpet
 Joe Pass - guitar
 John Heard - double bass
 Louie Bellson - drums

References 

1976 albums
Count Basie albums
Pablo Records albums
Albums produced by Norman Granz